Helene Dietrich (born 8 December 1960) is a former German footballer. She played in one match for the Germany national team in 1983.

Career 
Dietrich, who played from 1982 to 1984 in the Rhineland League under the Rhineland Association in the Regional Association Southwest for TuS Ahrbach, played her only international match for the national team on October 22, 1983. The last group game for the 1984 European Championship that took place in Brussels ended in a 1-1 draw with the national team of Belgium.

References

External links
 
 Helene Dietrich in the soccerdonna.de database
 Helene Dietrich on dfb.de

1960 births
Living people
German women's footballers
Germany women's international footballers
Place of birth missing (living people)
Women's association footballers not categorized by position